Des Raj Dhugga is an Indian politician and belongs to the ruling Shiromani Akali Dal. He was a member of Punjab Legislative Assembly and represented Sri Hargobindpur.

Family
His father's name is Bhulla Ram.

Political career
Dhugga first became a member of Punjab Legislative Assembly on the Congress ticket from Garhdiwala in 2002, which was reserved for candidates belonging to scheduled castes. He retained his seat in the 2007 Vidhan Sabha elections. In 2012 Garhdiwala underwent  Boundary delimitation and Sri Hargobindpur was converted from general category seat to a reserve category seat. Dhugga successfully contested from Sri Hargobindpur in 2012. He was made chief parliamentary secretary in 2007 Badal government. He continued on this position after the 2012 Punjab elections and was given the department of Animal Husbandry and Fisheries.

In 2021 he joined the Shiromani Akali Dal (Sanyukt) and then became the President of its SC wing.

References

Living people
Shiromani Akali Dal politicians
Punjab, India MLAs 2007–2012
Punjab, India MLAs 2012–2017
Place of birth missing (living people)
Punjab, India MLAs 2002–2007
People from Hoshiarpur district
1964 births